Vaupés River (Uaupés River) is a tributary of the Rio Negro in South America. It rises in the Guaviare Department of Colombia, flowing east through Guaviare and Vaupés Departments. It forms part of the international border between the Vaupés department of Colombia and the Amazonas state of Brazil.  On the border it merges with the Papurí River and becomes known as the Uaupés. In 1847 an explorer saw a rapid which hurled its waves  in the air, "as if great subaqueous explosions were taking place." The river continues on east through the Alto Rio Negro Indigenous Territory until it flows into the Rio Negro at São Joaquim, Amazonas.
Vaupés is a blackwater river.

See also
List of rivers of Amazonas

References

External links
Brazilian Ministry of Transport

Rivers of Amazonas (Brazilian state)
Rivers of Colombia
International rivers of South America
Brazil–Colombia border
Geography of Vaupés Department
Geography of Guaviare Department
Border rivers
Tributaries of the Rio Negro (Amazon)